Kilbride is a townland in County Westmeath, Ireland. The townland is located in the civil parish of the same name. The town of Dalystown lies to the west of the area, with Rochfortbridge and the townlands of Castlelost and Castlelost West bordering the south.

The De Profundis Stone is located in the townland.

References 

Townlands of County Westmeath